Wonderful World is an album by the Hawaiian musician Israel Kamakawiwoʻole released 2007, a decade after his death in 1997. The album is considered a classic, and suggested in some tourist guides as representative of Hawaiian contemporary music. The song is featured in the credits to the movie Meet Joe Black.

Track listing 
 "What a Wonderful World"
 "ʻAma ʻAma"
 "Henehene Kou ʻAka"
 "Twinkle Twinkle Little Star"
 "Morning Dew"
 "White Sandy Beach"
 "Kaleohano"
 "Ka Huila Wai"
 "ʻOpae E"
 "Ke Alo O Iesu"
 "ʻUlili E"
 "A Hawaiian Like Me"

References

Israel Kamakawiwoʻole albums
2007 compilation albums
Compilation albums published posthumously